Jujar may refer to:
 Jujar, Kermanshah
 Jujar, Salas-e Babajani, Kermanshah Province
 Jujar, Lorestan